A Greek Tragedy is a form of theatre from Ancient Greece and Anatolia.

Greek Tragedy may also refer to:

 Greek Tragedy (play), by Mike Leigh, 1989
 "Greek Tragedy" (song), a 2015 song by the Wombats